Robert Maciej Smoktunowicz (pronounced ; born January 30, 1962, in Warsaw) is a Polish politician. He represented Civic Platform (PO) in the Senate from 2001 to 2007. He gave up the membership in PO on September 17, 2007. Later that year he ran for re-election to the Polish Senate from the Left and Democrats list but to no avail.

References

1962 births
Living people
Politicians from Warsaw
Members of the Senate of Poland 2001–2005
Members of the Senate of Poland 2005–2007
Civic Platform politicians